Old Ship may refer to:

Places 
 Old Ship Street Historic District, Medford, Massachusetts, USA

Buildings 
 Old Ship, Aveley, Essex, London, England, UK
 Old Ship, Richmond, London, England, UK
 Old Ship Hotel, Brighton, England, UK
 Old Ship Church, Hingham, Massachusetts, USA
 Old Ship African Methodist Episcopal Zion Church, Montgomery, Alabama, USA

See also
 old (disambiguation)
 ship (disambiguation)